Nathan VanMetre House is a historic home located near Martinsburg, Berkeley County, West Virginia. It was built in 1872, and is a two-story, eight bay wide rectangular brick house with a steeply pitched gable roof, in the Greek Revival style. The main section of the house is five bays wide.  Also on the property is a small brick smokehouse (1872), large bank barn (1872), garage (c. 1920), two silos (c. 1915 and c. 1920), and chicken house (c. 1920).

It was listed on the National Register of Historic Places in 1994.

References

Houses on the National Register of Historic Places in West Virginia
Greek Revival houses in West Virginia
Houses completed in 1872
Houses in Berkeley County, West Virginia
National Register of Historic Places in Berkeley County, West Virginia